Brown of Harvard is a 1911 silent film based on the 1906 play of the same name by Rida Johnson Young.  It was the film debut of Edgar Kennedy.

Plot
The story deals with Tom Brown's efforts to save his fiance's "black sheep" brother Wilfred Kenyon from disgrace.  An unfortunate state of affairs exists between Wilfred and Marion Thorne, the sister of Gerald, who is stroking the varsity crew.  The situation is misunderstood by all but Tom.  Matters reach a climax on the day the big boat race between Harvard and a champion English crew.  Thorne as he is about to enter the boat is given an anonymous note to the effect that Marion is about to leave town with one of the college men.  He throws the race and rashes to his sister, whom he finds in possession of Tom's check for an amount to cover her expenses.  The check has been forged by Wilfred.  Crazed with grief and anger, he rushes back to the boathouse.  In the meantime, Tom Brown, Thorne's substitute has stroked the Harvard crew to victory and he is faced by the irate Thorne, who brands him as a scoundrel, producing the check to substantiate his charges.  Brown remains silent preferring to be misunderstood rather than expose his loved one's brother.  Wilfred confesses and wrongs are righted.

Cast
Edgar G. Wynn as Tom Brown of Harvard
Charles Clary as Gerald Thorne, a Tutor
George L. Cox as Wilfred Kenyon, a Black Sheep
Edgar Kennedy as Claxton Madden
James Le Boutillier as John Cartright
Frank Weed as Tubby Anderson
William Stowell as Happy Thurston
Charles A. Kellner as Bud Hall
Joseph Sullivan as Victor Colton
Fielding J. Thatcher as Codrington
Lillian Leighton as Mrs. Kenyon
Winifred Greenwood as Evelyn Kenyon
Adrienne Kroell as Marion Thorne, Gerald's Sister
Hobart Bosworth Uncredited
Bessie Eyton Uncredited
Kempton Greene as Student (uncredited)

External links

1911 films
American silent short films
American black-and-white films
American films based on plays
Films directed by Colin Campbell
Films set in Harvard University
1911 drama films
1911 short films
Silent American drama films
Harvard Crimson rowing
1910s American films